Kamppi Centre is a complex in the Kamppi district in the centre of Helsinki, Finland, designed by various architects, the main designer, however, being Juhani Pallasmaa. It is said to be Helsinki's new downtown commercial and residential centre. As a four-year construction project, it was the largest singular construction site in the history of Finland, involving the extensive and difficult redevelopment of the Kamppi district in downtown Helsinki.

The Kamppi Centre combines the commercial need for streamlined, optimized shopping environment with the necessary supply of customers by maximum accessibility and mobility. One of the first of its kind in Europe, the centre consists of:

 Central bus terminal for local buses
 Long-distance coach terminal (underground)
 Kamppi metro station (underground)
 A freight depot (underground)
 Internal parking area (underground)
 6 floor shopping centre with a supermarket, shops, restaurants, night clubs and service points
 High-class offices and residential apartments

The entire complex was opened in stages, with the new metro station entrance opened on 2 June 2005, the central bus terminal on 5 June, the long-distance bus terminal on 6 June and the shopping centre opened on 2 March 2006.

The appearance of the building is a reflection of the main architect Juhani Pallasmaa's ongoing interest in Constructivist architecture and Structuralist architecture, as if the building functions as a machine.

Transport

City bus terminal 
It is located on level E (ground level). About 900 buses pass through it daily, and during peak hours more than 100 buses per hour. The terminal has 17 platforms.

Intercity bus terminal 
Located on level C (-1 floor) at about 6 meters underground. The size of the hall is 14x125 meters. About 700 intercity buses depart from here daily. The terminal has 32 platforms.

Subway station 

It is located 30 meters from the surface of the ground.

Gekko is the entrance to the subway, located at ground level, in the center of the lobby. It is designed as a capsule about 4 meters in diameter, lined with ceramic tiles (surface area of about 275 m²).

External links 

  

Shopping centres in Helsinki
Bus stations in Europe
Kamppi